The University Athletic Association of the Philippines (UAAP) holds its two-day 3x3 basketball tournaments on first week of March. It was inaugurated as a demonstration event for seniors' division in UAAP Season 80 in 2018.

On the opening press conference of UAAP Season 82 in 2019, the UAAP Board announced that 3x3 basketball would become an official sport as of the said season for both men and women.

Format

Debut format 
3x3 basketball made its debut in UAAP Season 80 using the group stage format. The elimination round would be divided into two groups of three to four teams each. Each team will play the teams in its group once. The top two teams per group qualify for the semifinals. The higher-seed team of a group faces the lower-seeded team of the other group in one-game semifinals match. The semifinals winners advance to the final, which is also a one-game matchup.

Final four format 

The tournament currently uses the Final Four format, first implemented on its second year in UAAP Season 81. The tournament begins with a single round-robin elimination, where a team plays the other teams once to determine which teams will qualify to the semifinals. The top four finishers enter the Final Four phase. Semifinals and final stages are played in a single game.

Tournament results

Medal table 
The table is pre-sorted by the name of each university, but can be displayed as sorted by any other column, such as the total number of gold medals or total number of overall medals. To sort by gold, silver, and then bronze, sort first by the bronze column, then the silver, and then the gold.

Medal totals in this table are current as of UAAP Season 81.

See also 
 UAAP Basketball Championship

References 

College men's basketball competitions in the Philippines
College women's basketball competitions in the Philippines
Basketball, 3x3